Pot Luck was an Australian talent television series aired on Network Ten in 1987. It was hosted by Ernie Sigley.

Network 10 original programming
Australian music television series
1987 Australian television series debuts
1987 Australian television series endings
Music competitions in Australia
English-language television shows